Berlin Charter Township is a charter township of Monroe County in the U.S. state of Michigan.  At the 2010 census, the township population was 9,299.

The township was organized in 1867 from the eastern portion of Ash Township.  As part of the Monroe Metropolitan Area, the township is also included as part of the much larger Metro Detroit region.

Communities
Estral Beach is a village in the southeasternmost portion of the township along Lake Erie. As a village, Estral Beach has some autonomy but is still under the administration of the township. The population of the village was 418 at the 2010 census.
As an unincorporated area, Newport has no legal boundaries or demographic statistics of its own. Newport contains its own post office with the 48166 ZIP Code, and most locations in Berlin Charter Township use Newport as a mailing address. The areas included in the Newport ZIP Code extend into Frenchtown Charter Township to the south and also includes the Enrico Fermi Nuclear Generating Station.
It was first settled as early as 1830 and was originally called Newport. When a railway station named Newport opened to the west, this community adopted the name Oldport.
South Rockwood is a village located in the northern portion of the township along the border of Wayne County, adjacent to the city of Rockwood. South Rockwood contains its own post office with the 48179 ZIP Code.  The population of the village was 1,675 at the 2010 census.

Geography

The township is bordered on the south by Frenchtown Township and by Ash Township on the west.  The Huron River forms most of the northern border of the township with Brownstown Township and the cities of Rockwood and Flat Rock in Wayne County.

Portions of the Pointe Mouillee State Game Area and located within Berlin Township.  The township contains two listings on the National Register of Historic Places.  The Detroit River Light is within the township's water boundaries just south of the mouth of the Detroit River.  The Jefferson Avenue–Huron River Bridge crosses the Huron River, connecting Berlin Township to Brownstown Township along the U.S. Turnpike to Jefferson Avenue.  It is one of the few listings on the National Register of Historic Places to span multiple counties.

Demographics
The racial makeup of the township was 97.11% White, 0.49% African American, 0.33% Native American, 0.07% Asian, 0.01% Pacific Islander, 0.58% from other races, and 1.40% from two or more races. Hispanic or Latino of any race were 1.43% of the population.

There were 2,511 households, out of which 35.5% had children under the age of 18 living with them, 64.7% were married couples living together, 7.9% had a female householder with no husband present, and 23.4% were non-families. 18.3% of all households were made up of individuals, and 5.1% had someone living alone who was 65 years of age or older.  The average household size was 2.76 and the average family size was 3.15.

In the township the population was spread out, with 26.6% under the age of 18, 8.4% from 18 to 24, 30.1% from 25 to 44, 26.4% from 45 to 64, and 8.5% who were 65 years of age or older.  The median age was 36 years. For every 100 females, there were 106.9 males.  For every 100 females age 18 and over, there were 105.6 males.

The median income for a household in the township was $57,403, and the median income for a family was $64,071. Males had a median income of $48,431 versus $27,568 for females. The per capita income for the township was $23,898.  About 2.9% of families and 5.6% of the population were below the poverty line, including 7.6% of those under age 18 and 5.6% of those age 65 or over.

Education
The southeastern portion of the township is served by Jefferson Schools, while the northwest portion of the township is served by Airport Community Schools.  A very small northwesternmost portion of the township is served by Flat Rock Community Schools.

Highways

 (decommissioned) – currently follows the route of present-day U.S. Route 24

Images

References

External links 
 Berlin Charter Township official website

Townships in Monroe County, Michigan
Charter townships in Michigan
Michigan populated places on Lake Erie
Populated places established in 1867
1867 establishments in Michigan